The Japan national football team in 2016, managed by head coach Vahid Halilhodžić compete in the 2018 FIFA World Cup qualification – AFC second round and 2018 FIFA World Cup qualification – AFC third round amongst international friendly matches at home.

Record

Kits

Matches

Players statistics

Goalscorers

External links
Japan Football Association

Japan national football team results
2016 in Japanese football
Japan